The qualification process for the inaugural women's tournament of the 2009 Rugby World Cup Sevens. There are no automatic qualifiers, so all national teams qualified by way of regional tournaments. Unlike the men's tournament, the Arabian Gulf did not prequalify as hosts. The qualification process allocated two slots for Africa, two for North America/West Indies, one for South America, three for Asia, six for Europe and two for Oceania.

Qualified Teams

Africa
On 20−21 September, seven national teams plus an invitational team met in Kampala for two world cup slots, which has been won by finalists South Africa and Uganda, the former of which winning the tournament.

Pool Stage
Pool A
{| class="wikitable" style="text-align: center;"
|-
!width="160"|Teams
!width="40"|Pld
!width="40"|W
!width="40"|D
!width="40"|L
!width="40"|PF
!width="40"|PA
!width="40"|+/−
!width="40"|Pts
|-bgcolor=ccccff
|align=left|
|3||3||0||0||110||5||+105||9
|-bgcolor=ccccff
|align=left|
|3||2||0||1||42||55||–13||7
|-
|align=left|
|3||1||0||2||50||51||–1||5
|-
|align=left| Uganda A
|3||0||0||3||0||91||–91||3
|}

Pool B
{| class="wikitable" style="text-align: center;"
|-
!width="160"|Teams
!width="40"|Pld
!width="40"|W
!width="40"|D
!width="40"|L
!width="40"|PF
!width="40"|PA
!width="40"|+/−
!width="40"|Pts
|-bgcolor=ccccff
|align=left|
|3||3||0||0||110||5||+105||9
|-bgcolor=ccccff
|align=left|
|3||2||0||1||81||12||+69||7
|-
|align=left|
|3||1||0||2||24||83||–59||5
|-
|align=left|
|3||0||0||3||0||115||–115||3
|}

Playoffs
Plate
{{Round4-with third|consol=7th Place

|21 September 2008
||26| Uganda A|10
|21 September 2008
||17||0

|21 September 2008
||38||0

|21 September 2008
| Uganda A|20||7
}}CupNorth America/West Indies
From 24–26 October, eight women's teams met in Nassau, Bahamas for the NAWIRA Sevens. Champion Canada and runner-up United States ended up qualifying based on the allotted slots.

Pool StagePool A{| class="wikitable" style="text-align: center;"
|-
!width="180"|Teams
!width="40"|Pld
!width="40"|W
!width="40"|D
!width="40"|L
!width="40"|PF
!width="40"|PA
!width="40"|+/−
!width="40"|Pts
|-
|align=left|
|3||3||0||0||142||0||+142||9|-
|align=left|
|3||2||0||1||41||52||–11||7|-
|align=left|
|3||1||0||2||41||57||–16||5|-
|align=left|
|3||0||0||3||7||122||–115||3|}Pool B{| class="wikitable" style="text-align: center;"
|-
!width="180"|Teams
!width="40"|Pld
!width="40"|W
!width="40"|D
!width="40"|L
!width="40"|PF
!width="40"|PA
!width="40"|+/−
!width="40"|Pts
|-
|align=left|
|3||3||0||0||139||0||+139||9|-
|align=left|
|3||2||0||1||87||29||+58||7|-
|align=left|
|3||1||0||2||10||101||–91||5|-
|align=left|
|3||0||0||3||5||111||–106||3|}

PlayoffsPlateCupSouth America

The South American qualifier was held in Punta del Este on 18−19 January, with Brazil claiming the continent's sole women's World Cup spot.

Pool PlayPool A{| class="wikitable" style="text-align: center;"
|-
!width="160"|Teams
!width="40"|Pld
!width="40"|W
!width="40"|D
!width="40"|L
!width="40"|PF
!width="40"|PA
!width="40"|+/−
!width="40"|Pts
|-bgcolor=ccccff
|align=left|
|3||3||0||0||119||0||+119||9|-bgcolor=ccccff
|align=left|
|3||1||1||1||37||24||+13||6|-
|align=left|
|3||1||1||1||24||43||–19||6|-
|align=left|
|3||0||0||3||0||113||–113||3|}Pool B{| class="wikitable" style="text-align: center;"
|-
!width="160"|Teams
!width="40"|Pld
!width="40"|W
!width="40"|D
!width="40"|L
!width="40"|PF
!width="40"|PA
!width="40"|+/−
!width="40"|Pts
|-bgcolor=ccccff
|align=left|
|3||3||0||0||51||15||+36||9|-bgcolor=ccccff
|align=left|
|3||2||0||3||60||27||+33||7|-
|align=left|
|3||1||0||2||42||38||+4||5|-
|align=left|
|3||0||0||1||5||78||–73||3|}

PlayoffsPlateCupAsia
Nine women's national teams competed alongside the men's teams in Hong Kong on 4−5 October, contesting the three allotted World Cup slots. Finalists Japan and Thailand were joined by third-place China.

Pool StagePool A{| class="wikitable" style="text-align: center;"
|-
!width="160"|Teams
!width="40"|Pld
!width="40"|W
!width="40"|D
!width="40"|L
!width="40"|PF
!width="40"|PA
!width="40"|+/−
!width="40"|Pts
|-bgcolor=ccffcc
|align=left|
|2||2||0||0||30||5||+25||6|-bgcolor=ccccff
|align=left|
|2||1||0||1||17||15||+2||4|-bgcolor=ccccff
|align=left|
|2||0||0||2||5||32||–27||2|}Pool B{| class="wikitable" style="text-align: center;"
|-
!width="160"|Teams
!width="40"|Pld
!width="40"|W
!width="40"|D
!width="40"|L
!width="40"|PF
!width="40"|PA
!width="40"|+/−
!width="40"|Pts
|-bgcolor=ccffcc
|align=left|
|2||2||0||0||92||7||+85||6|-bgcolor=ccccff
|align=left| Arabian Gulf
|2||1||0||1||34||69||–35||4|-bgcolor=ffcccc
|align=left|
|2||0||0||2||17||67||–50||2|}Pool C{| class="wikitable" style="text-align: center;"
|-
!width="160"|Teams
!width="40"|Pld
!width="40"|W
!width="40"|D
!width="40"|L
!width="40"|PF
!width="40"|PA
!width="40"|+/−
!width="40"|Pts
|-bgcolor=ccffcc
|align=left|
|2||2||0||0||36||15||+21||6|-bgcolor=ccffcc
|align=left|
|2||1||0||1||37||12||+25||4|-bgcolor=ccccff
|align=left|
|2||0||0||2||5||51||–46||2|}

PlayoffPlateCupEurope

Europe had a sixteen-team tournament in Limoges, France on 14–15 June to determine the six teams eligible for the World Cup. The six top placing teams were England, France, Italy, Netherlands, Russia and Spain.

Oceania
Apia, Samoa played host to the qualifying tournament played concurrently with the men's tournament. The women's tournament started with a five-team round robin before the top four teams advance to the playoff, from which finalists Australia and New Zealand qualified for the World Cup.First Round{| class="wikitable" style="text-align: center;"
|-
!width="160"|Teams
!width="40"|Pld
!width="40"|W
!width="40"|D
!width="40"|L
!width="40"|PF
!width="40"|PA
!width="40"|+/−
!width="40"|Pts
|-bgcolor=ccccff
|align=left|
|4||4||0||0||141||12||+129||12|-bgcolor=ccccff
|align=left|
|4||3||0||1||124||25||+99||10|-bgcolor=ccccff
|align=left|
|4||2||0||2||89||64||+25||8|-bgcolor=ccccff
|align=left|
|4||1||0||3||60||92||–32||6|-
|align=left|
|4||0||0||4||0||221||–221||4|}Playoff'''

References

Rugby World Cup Sevens qualification
Qualifying
2008 in women's rugby union
2008 rugby sevens competitions